La'Shanda R. Holmes is a lieutenant commander in the United States Coast Guard and the first African-American female helicopter pilot for the Coast Guard.  She grew up in the foster care system and put herself through Spelman College. She was an Aircraft Commander at Air Station Los Angeles, Air Station Atlantic City (where she was deployed multiple times to Washington D.C. (NCR) as a rotary wing air intercept pilot), and Air Station Miami. She has amassed over 2,000 flight hours conducting search and rescue, counter drug, law enforcement, and Presidential air-intercept missions.  She was appointed as a White House Fellow in 2015 by President Barack Obama. In 2015–2016 she was the Special Assistant to the NASA Administrator General Charles F. Bolden.

Holmes received her BA in psychology from Spelman College and is a Bonner Scholar. She sits on the board of directors for Tomorrow's Aeronautical Museum, Foster Club, and Girls Fly!

References

Further reading

1985 births
Living people
Helicopter pilots
Women aviators
United States Coast Guard officers
Female United States Coast Guard personnel
United States Naval Aviators
African-American female military personnel
African-American aviators
Spelman College alumni
White House Fellows
African-American women aviators
American women aviators
Women United States Naval Aviators
African-American United States Coast Guard personnel